Moons of Jupiter is an album by the American jazz trombonist Steve Swell, recorded in 1997 and released on CIMP. He leads a quartet with Mark Whitecage on reeds, Dominic Duval on bass, and Jay Rosen on drums.

Reception

The Penguin Guide to Jazz notes that: "Moons of Jupiter gets a tumultuous start with the overwhelmingly powerful 'For Henry Darger'. The rest of the record turns out as a free-bop date with flashes of brilliance."

The JazzTimes review by John Murph states that "Swell boasts an intriguing set that keenly balances the hemispheres of the free and structured."

Track listing
All compositions by Steve Swell
"For Henry Darger" - 12:03
"Callisto" - 4:31
"The I Refuse Blues" - 7:33
"Io" - 1:33
"Moons of Jupiter" - 10:31
"Europa" - 2:45
"The Human Touch" - 9:39
"Ganymede" - 2:43
"(be) Conversational" - 8:02

Personnel
Steve Swell - trombone
Mark Whitecage - alto sax, alto clarinet
Dominic Duval - bass
Jay Rosen - drums

References

1997 albums
Steve Swell albums
CIMP albums